K. K. College Of Engineering and Management (KKCEM) is an engineering institute situated in the valley of Tundi at Gobindpur in Dhanbad, Jharkhand, India. It was established in the year of 2010.

Academics
The college offers 4 year degree courses in Civil Engineering, Electrical Engineering, Mechanical Engineering, Electronics & Communication Engineering and Computer Science Engineering and 3 year 2nd shift diploma course in Mechanical Engineering. Admission is through Jharkhand Combined Entrance Examination or AIEEE. The courses are approved by the All India Council for Technical Education (AICTE).

See also
Education in India
Literacy in India
List of institutions of higher education in Jharkhand

References

External links 
 

Engineering colleges in Jharkhand
Education in Dhanbad district
Educational institutions established in 2010
2010 establishments in Jharkhand